Evelyn Noelle Woodeson (née Middleton; 18 December 1926 – 30 January 2016) was an Irish actress and one of the first BBC television announcers. She was also a leading lady of the 1950s British films.

Middleton received a BAFTA Film Award nomination for her leading role in Carrington V.C. (1954). Her other notable film roles were in Happy Ever After (1954), John and Julie (1955), The Iron Petticoat (1956), and Three Men in a Boat (1956).

Biography
Middleton was the daughter of Lillian (née Martin) and Wilbur Middleton. She had a brother, Gerald.
She attended Trinity College, Dublin, but left and began her career on the stage at the famous Gate Theatre in Dublin. In the 1950s she moved to London and began appearing in British films. She was also an announcer on the BBC.

Her first film was South of Algiers in 1953. Other films include Carrington V.C. with David Niven and The Iron Petticoat with Katharine Hepburn and Bob Hope. She was nominated for a BAFTA Film Award for Best Actress in 1955 for her performance in Carrington V.C.. She was a founding member of Irish Actors' Equity.

She retired and returned to County Sligo to run an oyster farm at Culleenamore Bay. Noelle died on 30 January 2016 at Summerville Nursing Home, Strandhill, Co. Sligo aged 89.

Filmography

Awards and nominations

References

External links 
 

1926 births
2016 deaths
Irish stage actresses
People from Sligo (town)
Irish film actresses
People educated at Rathdown School